Willkomm is a surname. Notable people with the surname include:

 Aenne Willkomm (1902–1979), later Aenne Kettelhut, German costume designer
 Heinrich Moritz Willkomm (1821–1895), German academic and botanist
 Katharina Willkomm (Katharina Kloke, born 1987), German lawyer and politician